Herbert William Hart (21 September 1859 – 2 November 1895) was an English first-class cricketer, who played one match as an amateur for Yorkshire County Cricket Club in 1888.

Born in Cottingham, near Hull, East Riding of Yorkshire, England, Hart was a left arm fast bowler, whose only outing came against the Marylebone Cricket Club (MCC) at Lord's.  After going wicketless in the first innings, he took 2 for 19 in the second innings, clean bowling Wilfred Flowers for a duck and Charles Wright for 14.  However, Yorkshire lost by 103 runs.  He scored 3 in each innings, batting at number nine.  He was one of eight  victims for George Hearne (8 for 30) in Yorkshire's first innings, in which Hearne took a hat-trick.

Hart died in Cottingham aged 36, in November 1895.

References

External links
Cricinfo Profile
Cricket Archive Statistics

1859 births
1895 deaths
Yorkshire cricketers
People from Cottingham, East Riding of Yorkshire
English cricketers
Cricketers from Yorkshire